Tomás is a Spanish, Portuguese, and Irish (also in the archaic forms Thomaz, Thomás and Tomaz) given name equivalent of Thomas.

It may refer to:
 Tomás de Anchorena (1783–1847), Argentine statesman and lawyer
 Tomás de Bhaldraithe (1916–1996), Irish language scholar and lexicographer
 Tomás de Herrera (1804–1859), Neogranadine statesman and general
 Tomás de Iriarte y Oropesa (1750–1791), Spanish neoclassical poet
 Tomás de Jesús Mangual (1944–2011), Puerto Rican crime reporter
 Tomás de la Cerda, 3rd Marquis of la Laguna (1638–1692), viceroy of New Spain
 Tomás de la Rosa (born 1978), Dominican Major League Baseball infielder
 Tomás de Rocamora (1740–1819), Argentine governor
 Tomás de Santa María (died 1570), Spanish music theorist, organist and composer
 Tomás de Teresa (born 1968), former Spanish middle distance runner
 Tomás de Torquemada (1420–1498), fifteenth century Spanish Dominican
 Tomás de Torres (16th century), Portuguese teacher, astrologer and doctor
 Tomás de Zumalacárregui (1788–1835), Spanish Carlist general
 Tomás Aldazabal (born 1976), Cuban volleyball player
 Tomás Antônio Gonzaga (1744–1809), Luso-Brazilian poet
 Tomás Argento (born 1986), Argentine field hockey striker
 Tomás Arias (1856–1932), Panamanian politician and businessman
 Tomás Batista (born 1935), Puerto Rican sculptor
 Tomás Berreta (1875–1947), Uruguayan political figure
 Tomás Bilbao (1890–1954), Basque-origin Spanish architect and politician
 Tomás Borge (1930–2012), last living co-founder of the Sandinista movement in Nicaragua
 Tomás Bretón (1850–1923), Spanish musician and composer
 Tomás Cámara y Castro (1847–1904), Catholic bishop
 Tomás Carrasquilla (1858–1940), Colombian writer
 Tomás Cipriano de Mosquera (1798–1878), Colombian general and political figure
 Tomás Corrigan (born 1990), Gaelic footballer
 Tomás Diez Acosta (born 1946), Cuban revolutionary soldier
 Tomás Eloy Martínez (1934–2010), Argentine journalist and writer
 Tomás Estrada Palma (1832–1908), Cuban political figure
 Tomás Faundez (born 2007), Chilean comedian
 Tomás Fernández (disambiguation), several people
 Tomás Fonzi (born 1981), Argentine actor
 Tomás Frías Ametller (1804–1884), noted politician
 Tomás Garicano (1910–1988), Spanish military lawyer and politician
 Tomás Garrido Canabal (1891–1943), Mexican politician and revolutionary
 Tomás Gil (born 1977), Venezuelan track and road cyclist
 Tomás Godoy Cruz (1791–1852), Argentine statesman and businessman
 Tomás González (born 1959), Cuban track and field sprinter
 Tomás Guardia Gutiérrez (1831–1882), President of Costa Rica
 Tomás Guido (1788–1866), General in the Argentine War of Independence
 Tomás Gutiérrez Alea (1928–1996), Cuban filmmaker
 Tomás Guzmán (born 1982), Paraguayan football striker
 Tomás Harris (died 1964), Spanish-speaking officer with MI6 during World War II
 Tomás Hirsch (born 1956), Chilean politician and businessman
 Tomás José González-Carvajal (1753–1834), Spanish poet and statesman
 Tomás Luceño (1844–1933), Spanish poet and playwright
 Tomás Luis de Victoria (1548–1611), Spanish composer
 Tomás Mac Curtain (1884–1920), Sinn Féin Lord Mayor of Cork
 Tomás Mac Giolla (1924–2010), Irish member of parliament
 Tomás MacCormik (born 1978), field hockey midfielder
 Tomás Maldonado (1922–2018), Argentine painter, designer and thinker
 Tomás Manuel Lopes da Silva (born 1972), Portuguese former association football goalkeeper
 Tomás Marco (born 1942), Spanish composer and writer
 Tomás Marín de Poveda (1650–1703), Spanish colonial administrator
 Tomás Martínez (1820–1873), President of Nicaragua
 Tomás Medina (1803–1884), President of El Salvador
 Tomás Mejía (1820–1867), Mexican soldier
 Tomás Méndez (1927–1995), Mexican composer and singer
 Tomás Milián (1933–2017), Cuban-American actor
 Tomás Monfil (19??-2009), Chilean forester 
 Tomás Monje (1884–1959), President of Bolivia
 Tomaz Morais (born 1970), Portuguese rugby union coach
 Tomás Mulcahy (born 1963), Irish hurling manager and former player
 Tomás N. Alonso (1881–1962), Cebuano Visayan writer
 Tomás Nistal (born 1948), Spanish former road cyclist
 Tomás Ó Criomhthain (1856–1937), Irish memoirist
 Tomás Ó Fiaich (1923–1990), Irish cardinal
 Tomás Ó Sé, Irish Gaelic football player
 Tomás O'Horán y Escudero (1819–1867), Mexican-Irish General
 Tomás O'Leary (born 1983), Irish Rugby Union player
 Tomás Olias Gutiérrez (born 1969), Spanish footballer
 Tomas Osmeña (born 1948), Filipino politician, Mayor of Cebu City
 Tomás Pérez (born 1973), Venezuelan Major League Baseball infielder
 Tomás Quinn, Irish Gaelic footballer
 Tomás Rafael Rodríguez Zayas (1949–2010), Cuban artist and illustrator
 Tomás Regalado (Salvadoran politician) (1861–1906), President of El Salvador
 Tomás Reñones (born 1960), Spanish football (soccer) player
 Tomaz Ribas (1918–1999), writer, ethnologist and critic of theatre and dance
 Tomás Rivera (1935–1984), Chicano author, poet, and educator
 Tomás Romero Pereira (1886–1982), President of Paraguay
 Tomás Ruíz González (born 1963), Mexican politician
 Tomás Ryan, Irish former hurling player
 Tomaz Salomão (born 1954), Mozambican economist
 Tomás Taveira (born 1938), Portuguese architect
 Tomás Teresen (born 1987), Venezuelan road cyclist
 Tomás Torres Mercado, Mexican politician
 Tomás Valladares, President of Nicaragua
 Tomaz Vieira da Cruz (1900–1960), Portuguese poet
 Tomás Yarrington (born 1957), Mexican politician

See also
 Santo Tomás (disambiguation)
 Thomaz

Spanish masculine given names
Portuguese masculine given names